The Passionists, officially named Congregation of the Passion of Jesus Christ, abbreviated CP, is a Catholic clerical religious congregation of Pontifical Right for men, founded by Paul of the Cross in 1720 with a special emphasis on and devotion to the Passion of Jesus Christ. A known symbol of the congregation is the labeled emblem of the Sacred Heart of Jesus, surmounted by a cross and is often sewn into the attire of its congregants.

History
Paul of the Cross who was born in 1694 in Ovada, wrote the rules of the Congregation between 22 November 1720 & 1 January 1721, and in June 1725 Pope Benedict XIII granted Paul the permission to form his congregation. Paul and his brother, John Baptist Danei, were ordained by the pope on the same occasion (7 June).

After serving for a time in the hospital of St. Gallicano, in 1737 they left Rome with permission of the Pope and went to Mount Argentario, where they established the first house of the institute. They took up their abode in a small hermitage near the summit of the mount, to which was attached a chapel dedicated to Saint Anthony. They were soon joined by three companions, one of whom was a priest, and the observance of community life according to the rules began there and is continued there to the present day. Paul of the Cross and his companions – they now totalled six priests and two brothers – began a retreat.

In 1769, Clement XIV granted full rights to the Passionists as enjoyed by the other religious institutes, making them not an order but a congregation.  The congregation historically has had two primary goals: Preaching Missions and contemplative life, with an attempt to blend the two. Its founder had attempted to combine aspects of the contemplative orders, such as the Trappist monks, together with the dynamic orders, such as the Jesuits.

Both the members and the works of the congregation are entrusted to the protection of the Blessed Virgin Mary under the title of Our Lady of Sorrows, as patroness of the congregation, with Saint Michael and Saint Joseph as co patrons.
Every Passionist religious is required to honour them, together with the founder, Paul of the Cross, and the other saints of the congregation, whose feasts they celebrate in community.

On June 11, 1741, they first affixed the emblem or "sign" of the Passion (Jesu XPI Passio) on their black tunics. The professed renewed their vows, and the new members pronounced their first vows.

Charism
"We seek the unity of our lives and our apostolate in the Passion of Jesus."  The Passionate express their participation in the Passion by a special vow, by which they bind themselves to keep alive the memory of the Passion of Christ. They strive to foster awareness of its meaning and value for each person and for the life of the world. They seek to incorporate this vow into our daily lives by living the evangelical counsels.

Apostolate

Traditionally, their main apostolate has been preaching missions and retreats. According to Paul of the Cross, they were founded in order to "teach people how to pray", which they do through activities such as retreats and missions, spiritual direction, and prayer groups. Today they often also assist local churches in pastoral works, including saying masses, hearing confessions, and visiting the sick.  Due to the continuing shortage of priests throughout the world, the Passionists today are sometimes designated as parish priests and curates of various parishes. The Passionists hold many retreat and conference centers around the world.

Unlike the La Sallians or the Gabrielites, Passionists do not usually open schools and universities, except seminaries for their own students wishing to become brothers and priests.  There are some schools sponsored and run by the Passionists, like the St. Gemma Galgani School, (which includes primary, junior high and high school-level education) in Santiago (Chile), but these are more the exception than the rule. The Passionists are involved in social welfare projects and education mainly in the various mission territories assigned to them.

Though Passionists are not required to work in non-Christian areas as missionaries, their Rule allows its members to be posted to missionary work, such as mainland China (before the Communists took over in 1949), India, and Japan, and in many other nations in Africa, Asia, Latin America and elsewhere as dictated by the pope or at the invitation of a local Bishop.

There are 2,179 Passionists in 61 countries on the five continents, led by a superior general who is elected every six years. He is assisted  by six consultors in governing the congregation. The congregation is divided into provinces, vice-provinces and missions. The Congregation is also divided into groups of provinces, vice-provinces and missions called configurations. The presidents of the six configurations constitute the Extended General Council which meets with the Superior General and his consultors annually.

 
 
There are six configurations in the world:

 MAPRES: The Configuration of Mary Presented In The Temple which includes Italy, France and Portugal and related mission territories.
 CCH: The Configuration of Charles Houben which includes Ireland, England, Scotland, Wales, Germany, Poland, Belgium, the Czech Republic, Ukraine, Holland, Sweden and related mission territories; 
 CJC: The Configuration of Jesus Crucified which includes Mexico, Brazil, the United States, Argentina, Puerto Rico, the Dominican Republic, Haiti, Canada, Uruguay, Paraguay and related mission territories
 PASPAC: The Configuration of the Passionists in Asia Pacific which includes Australia, New Zealand, Papua New Guinea, the Philippines, Korea, Japan, Indonesia, India, China and Vietnam and related mission territories; 
 CPA: The Configuration of the Passionists of Africa, which includes Kenya, Tanzania, the Republic of the Congo, South Africa, Botswana, Zambia and related mission territories; 
 SCOR: The Configuration of the Sacred Heart which includes Spain, Peru, Colombia, Ecuador, Venezuela, Chile, Panama, Honduras, Guatemala, Cuba, El Salvador, Bolivia, Nicaragua and related mission territories.

The official name of the institute is "The Congregation of the Passion of Jesus Christ". The superior general resides in Rome (Piazza Ss. Giovanni e Paolo, 13, 00184 Roma; tel. 06 772711). The founder is buried in a chapel attached to the Basilica of Saints John and Paul, and the General Headquarters also hosts an international house of studies for Passionists from around the world.

Characteristics of the Congregation

Passionist monasteries are referred to as "retreats". The members of the congregation are not allowed to possess land, and the congregation collectively can only own the community house and a bit of land attached to it.  They rely completely on their own labor and on contributions from the faithful in order to maintain themselves financially. The habit worn by members is a rough wool tunic bearing the words "Jesu XPI Passio", meaning "Passion of Jesus Christ", and the congregation was historically discalced, wearing sandals rather than shoes.

With regard to Popular Piety, the Congregation is also known for promoting devotion to the Passion among the faithful by the use of "Black Scapular of the Passion" usually worn by aspirants to the Passionist way of life. Different devotional practices such as Devotion to the Five Wounds of Christ, The Seven Sorrows of The Blessed Virgin Mary, Stations of the Cross and various forms of the Office in honour of the Passion are still widely promoted among its members.

Confraternity of the Passion
The "Black Scapular of the Passion" is a Roman Catholic devotional scapular associated with the Passionists. The tradition of the Passionists holds that in 1720 before Paul of the Cross founded the Congregation of the Passionists he had a Marian apparition during which was revealed the black habit of the order with the badge on chest. Pope Pius IX approved of this Scapular by a Brief dated June 24, 1864. Thereafter, the Passionist Fathers established the "Confraternity of the Passion of Jesus Christ", and gave the faithful who wished to associate themselves more closely with their order a black scapular in honor of the Passion of Christ. No special practice besides wearing the Scapular and leading a good Christian life is obligatory in order to participate in the privileges of the confraternity. 

The small scapular has a replica of the badge of the Passionists. It is made of black cloth, having on the front the figure of a Heart surmounted by a White Cross and bears the words "Jesu XPI Passio sit semper in cordibus nostris" (May the passion of Jesus Christ always be in our hearts.) The other portion of the scapular hanging at the back, may consist simply of a small segment of black cloth, but at times has an image of the Crucifixion of Christ. Various other indulgences for the faithful who wear this scapular, were approved by the Congregation for Indulgences in 1877. The Superior-General of the Passionists communicates to other priests the faculty to bless and invest with the scapular.

Saints and Blesseds of the Congregation of the Passion 

Canonised members of the Congregation 
 Paul of the Cross, founder of the congregation
 Vincent Strambi, proto-bishop
 Gabriel of Our Lady of Sorrows, student
 Gemma Galgani, a lay Passionist aspirant 
 Innocencio of Mary Immaculate, a martyr of the Spanish Civil War
 Charles of Mount Argus, a Dutchman who ministered and died in Co, Dublin in Ireland
 Maria Goretti, instructed by the Passionists in preparation for First Holy Communion, also Postulators of her cause for sainthood

Beatified members of the Congregation
 Eugene Bossilkov, Bulgarian Bishop and Martyr
 Lorenzo Maria of Saint Francis Xavier, Missionary
 Isidore of Saint Joseph, lay brother
 Dominic Barberi, brought the Passionists to Belgium, England and Ireland. Also known for having received John Henry Newman into the Catholic Church at Littlemore, Oxford
 Bernard Mary of Jesus, Superior General and Novitiate classmate of St Gabriel of Our Lady of Sorrows
 Grimoaldo of the Purification, student
 Pius of Saint Aloysius, student
 The twenty-six Catholic Martyrs of Daimiel

In addition, the causes for the canonisation of Carl Schmitz, Ignatius Spencer, Theodore Foley and Elizabeth Prout have been opened.

Other notable members
 John Moynihan Tettemer (Father Ildefonso), appointed consultor general of the order in 1914
 Kieran Creagh is an Irish Passionist priest who was shot in South Africa
 Martin J. Newell is an English Passionist priest, anti-war protester and climate activist
 Brian D'Arcy is an Irish Passionist priest, a writer, newspaper columnist, broadcaster, and preacher.
 Edward L. Beck is an American Passionist priest and CNN commentator.
 Gabriele Amorth  priest and exorcist of the Diocese of Rome who performed tens of thousands of exorcisms over his sixty plus years as a priest. As the appointed exorcist for the diocese of Rome, Amorth was the Chief Exorcist of the Vatican.
 Thomas Berry cultural historian, teacher, Fordham University, author “Dream of the Earth”, “The Great Work”, “The Universe Story”.

Passionist Sisters

The Passionist Sisters (the Sisters of the Cross and Passion) is an institute founded in 1852 by Father Gaudentius Rossi, an early Passionist priest, in collaboration with Elizabeth Prout. In its beginnings, it was called "Sisters of the Holy Family", and was later included under the Passionist family.

Due to their separate raisings guided by members of the congregation, Maria Goretti and Gemma Galgani are traditionally counted in the ranks of the Passionist Sisters, even though they died before they could formally enter the institute (Maria was murdered, Gemma died of tuberculosis).

See also

 Chaplet of the Five Wounds

References

External links

 International Website of the Passionists (English, Spanish, Italian)
 Passionists Australia, New Zealand and Papua New Guinea
 Passionists in the Philippines
 Passionists in Chile (Spanish, under construction)
 Passionists in France
 Website of the Sisters of the Cross and Passion
 Website of the Passionists of St. Paul of the Cross Province, North America
 Website of the Passionists of Holy Cross Province, North America
 Passionists in the U.K.

 
1725 establishments in the Papal States
Religious organizations established in the 1720s
 
Catholic religious institutes established in the 18th century
1725 establishments in Italy